Cosmopolitan Democratic Party is a Somali political party. Founded on 6 May 2015.

Leadership 

 The Chairperson is Samiya Lerew. Her grandfather was a politician. Her mother was a Somali celebrity, a singer and broadcaster with Radio Mogadishu, and her father an Eritrean lawyer. In 1982, Samiya came to the UK to study English and train in secretarial and administrative studies.
 The Secretary-General is Falastin Hussein.
 The Vice President is Salah Mikomwa.
 Ibrahim Addo is responsible for Foreign Relations.
 Sadat Geesh is responsible for Press and Youth Engagement.
 Osman Mohando is responsible for Social and Family Malware.
 Hodan Abdi is responsible for Finance.

Ideology 
According to the Founder of Party, Yarow Sharif Aden, the Constitution of Party is based on the values of liberalism, every Somali should be counted as and valued as a citizen of the country and should have equal opportunities in every aspect of the society, and every individual’s right should be protected and must not be sacrificed in favour of a group.

Party objectives 
The main goal of the party is to give left behind communities a viable political voice, advocating for equal opportunity, economic inclusivity, education opportunities for the youth and homestead resettlement, and to unite Somalis for a better future.

The party endeavor to encourage policies that promote inclusivity, citizenship based society, progressive human development and where necessary implement affirmative action to allow temporary measures in order to compensate for the damages caused by 4.5 system inequalities. The party also will endeavor to encourage constituencies to elect their own party representative for real democracy to take root. It means that constituents won't be allowed to elect their representatives on the based of their clan affiliation, religion or race.

See also 

 Political parties in Somalia

References 

Political parties in Somalia
Political parties established in 2015
Liberal parties in Somalia
2015 establishments in Somalia